Nepenthes kampotiana is a tropical pitcher plant native to southern Cambodia, eastern Thailand, and at least southern coastal Vietnam. It has an altitudinal distribution of 0–600 m above sea level. The specific epithet kampotiana refers to the Cambodian city of Kampot, close to which the first specimens of this species were collected.

This species is closely related to N. chang. Nepenthes geoffrayi is a heterotypic synonym of N. kampotiana.

In his Carnivorous Plant Database, taxonomist Jan Schlauer treats N. kampotiana as a heterotypic synonym of N. smilesii.

Natural hybrids
N. bokorensis × N. kampotiana
N. kampotiana × N. mirabilis

References

Further reading

 Mey, F.S. 2010.  Cambodian Journal of Natural History 2010(2): 106–117.
 Mey, F.S. 2011. Utricularia delphinioides. Again!. Strange Fruits: A Garden's Chronicle, September 30, 2011.
 Mey, F.S. 2011. Introducing Nepenthes kampotiana. Strange Fruits: A Garden's Chronicle, October 22, 2011.
 Mey, F.S. 2014. 'Nepenthes of Indochina', my 2010 ICPS lecture now on Youtube. Strange Fruits: A Garden's Chronicle, February 3, 2014.
 Mey, F.S. 2014. Hydnophytum formicarum habitat in Cambodia. Strange Fruits: A Garden's Chronicle, February 26, 2014. 
 Cambodian scrubland taxa incl. Utricularia delphinioides. CPUK Forum, August 15, 2011.

External links
Nepenthes of Indochina

Carnivorous plants of Asia
kampotiana
Flora of Cambodia
Flora of Thailand
Flora of Vietnam
Plants described in 1909